Aeneas Demetrius Williams (born January 29, 1968) is an American former professional football player who was a cornerback and safety in the National Football League (NFL) for 14 seasons, primarily with the Arizona Cardinals franchise. He played college football for the Southern Jaguars and was selected in the third round of the 1991 NFL Draft by the Cardinals, where he spent 10 seasons. During his final four seasons, he was a member of the St. Louis Rams. Williams received eight Pro Bowl selections and three first-team All-Pro honors, as well as being on the second NFL 1990s All-Decade Team. He was inducted into the Pro Football Hall of Fame in 2014.

Early life
Williams was born in New Orleans, Louisiana, to Lawrence and Lillian Williams. Aeneas is the youngest of 3 brothers, Malcolm and Achilles. He attended the now defunct Alcee Fortier High School, where he played football on a team with three future NFL players: Maurice Hurst, Kevin Lewis, and Ashley Ambrose. In 1985, the Fortier Tarpons went undefeated through 10 games and won the District 10-4A championship and proceeded to the Class 4A semifinals. Aeneas was selected to the all district team as a strong safety that season.

College career
Williams was not offered a scholarship when he graduated high school.  He attended Southern University, the same school his brother Achilles attended, planning to simply get his accounting degree. "Our parents always expected that we would go to college and get our degree," he explained.  "(Playing football) never crossed by mind, I was preparing for the rest of my life."

At Southern, he concentrated on his academics, not playing football until his junior year.  Eventually, after being encouraged by his old high school teammate Maurice Hurst, he decided to join the team as a walk-on.  He started out playing mostly on special teams, but made the starting lineup in the 5th game.  Williams kept his involvement with the football team a secret from his family until he made the travel squad for the 2nd game of the season. In the following season, Williams was named to the All-Southwestern Athletic Conference team after leading the conference with seven interceptions.  In 1990, Williams stayed on the team as a graduate student and fifth year senior in order to improve his draft status.  He made the ALL SAC team again and tied the Division I-AA, (now known as the NCAA Football Championship Subdivision) record for most interceptions with eleven.

Williams finished his college career with 20 interceptions and 28 pass deflections.

Professional career

Williams's numbers impressed the then-Phoenix Cardinals enough that they selected him in the third round of the 1991 NFL Draft, Williams quickly established himself with an exceptional rookie season, tying the NFC lead for interceptions. In 1994, he led the NFL in interceptions with 9. By 1997, Williams had already notched four Pro Bowl appearances and had established himself as the Cardinals' top cornerback, routinely covering the opponents' lead receivers.  In the 1998 season, Williams helped the Cardinals win their first playoff game since 1947 by intercepting two passes from Troy Aikman in a 20–7 win over the Dallas Cowboys, and added another interception in the Cardinals 41–21 loss in the divisional round. Despite playing mostly for bad teams (1998 was the only time he played on a winning team during his 10 years in Arizona), Williams was recognized as one of the best cornerbacks in the league, making six Pro Bowls in all as a Cardinal. He is regarded as one of the best defenders and players in Cardinals history, as well as one of the greatest shutdown corners of all time. In 2000, he tied an NFL record, held by Jack Tatum of the Oakland Raiders, by returning a fumble (caused by Mark Maddox) 104 yards for a touchdown in a game against the Washington Redskins.

In Week 3 of the 1999 season, in a game played at Sun Devil Stadium and nationally televised on Monday Night Football, Williams delivered the hit which ultimately ended Hall of Fame San Francisco 49ers' quarterback Steve Young's career. Williams came in on a cornerback blitz from Young's blindside and scored a vicious helmet-to-helmet hit on Young. Running back Lawrence Phillips was supposed to block Williams, but missed. This left Young unconscious on the field for several minutes. Young suffered a severe concussion that effectively ended his career; he didn't play again for the rest of the season, after which the 49ers all but forced him to retire.

In 2001, Williams was traded to the St. Louis Rams on draft day in exchange for picks in the second and fourth rounds. Due to roster concerns, Williams switched to free safety. As one of the leaders of a much-improved defense, Williams got a chance to play in the postseason for only the second time in his career. In the Rams' divisional playoff game against the Green Bay Packers prior to the Super Bowl, he returned two interceptions from Packers quarterback Brett Favre for touchdowns and recovered a fumble. Then in the NFC title game, he intercepted a pass from Philadelphia Eagles quarterback Donovan McNabb, with 2 minutes left in regulation, clinching the game and ensuring the Rams' berth in Super Bowl XXXVI. However, the Rams lost that game to the New England Patriots.

After a lackluster season, in which he ended on the injured reserve list, Williams quietly retired during the 2005 offseason. Over his career he accumulated a staggering 12 defensive touchdowns (9 interceptions returned for a touchdown, and 3 fumbles recovered for touchdowns), and 55 career interceptions, cementing his place as one of the most dominating defensive backs of his era. He also recovered 23 fumbles and gained 1,075 total defensive return yards (807 from interceptions and 268 from fumbles). He was also a 4-time All-Pro selection.

Although Williams only played on a playoff team four times in 14 years (three of which were with the Rams), he made the most of his postseason opportunities when they occurred, intercepting 6 passes and recovering one fumble in his first four playoff games.

Post-playing career
Williams was inducted into the Arizona Cardinals' Ring of Honor during the 2008–2009 football season during halftime of the Monday Night Football game against the San Francisco 49ers November 10, 2008. On January 18, 2009, he was chosen to present the George Halas Trophy to the Arizona Cardinals after their victory in the NFC Championship game, resulting in the Cardinals first trip to the Super Bowl. He made his final appearance in a football videogame in NFL Street 2, which was released in 2004.

Williams is currently the founding pastor of Spirit Church in St. Ann, a suburb of St. Louis. He and his wife Tracy have three daughters Saenea  (Aeneas spelled backwards), Tirzah, Cheyenne, and a son, Lazarus.

Williams was a finalist for the Pro Football Hall of Fame classes of 2012 and 2013 but did not get voted in on the final ballots both times. He was elected to the Pro Football Hall of Fame on February 1, 2014, and inducted on August 2.

On September 24, 2014, Williams was inducted into the St. Louis Sports Hall of Fame.

References

Further reading

External links
 
 Ex-Cardinals defensive back Aeneas Williams a finalist for Pro Football Hall of Fame
 Pro-Football-Reference.com

1968 births
Alcee Fortier High School alumni
African-American Christians
American football cornerbacks
American football safeties
Arizona Cardinals players
Living people
National Conference Pro Bowl players
Phoenix Cardinals players
Southern Jaguars football players
St. Louis Rams players
Players of American football from New Orleans
African-American players of American football
Pro Football Hall of Fame inductees
21st-century African-American people
20th-century African-American sportspeople
Ed Block Courage Award recipients